El Makarem de Mahdia, often referred to as EMM or mainly El-Makarem is a Tunisian football team from the city of Mahdia. The club was founded in 1937. They play in blue and white colors and are based at the Rached Khouja Stadium.

Coaching history
 Adel Zouali, Lotfi Boukhris, Mourad Sebayi, Foued Bahri, Nader Werda – 2012–2013
 Karim Gabsi – 2013–2014
 Fethi Hadj Ismaïl – 2014–2015

 

Association football clubs established in 1937
Football clubs in Tunisia
1937 establishments in Tunisia
Sports clubs in Tunisia
Mahdia